David Brocken (born 18 February 1971) is a retired Belgian football player and current coach.

Playing career
After a long career in his home country, Brocken played 41 league matches for Vålerenga IF Fotball in 2004 and 2005.

Manager career
After his active career, David Brocken became youth coördinator with Lierse S.K. In 2007, he went back to Norway to become youth coördinator with another former team, Vålerenga. From 2009 he was sports director/youth coördinator with Frigg Oslo.

Since 2012 Brocken has been the chief trainer of Kolbotn Fotball's elite-league women's team.

He also started coaching the low-league men's team Rilindja IL.

On 11 December 2015 it was announced that he would become the new head coach of Vålerenga Fotball Damer.

He was sacked from Vålerenga in August 2016.

Honours

Club
Lierse
 Belgian First Division A: 1996–97
 Belgian Cup: 1998–99
 Belgian Super Cup: 1997

Anderlecht
 Belgian First Division A: 1999–2000

References

External links
 

1971 births
Living people
Belgian footballers
Belgium international footballers
Belgian expatriate footballers
Lierse S.K. players
R.S.C. Anderlecht players
Standard Liège players
K.F.C. Lommel S.K. players
Vålerenga Fotball players
Expatriate footballers in Norway
Belgian expatriate sportspeople in Norway
Belgian Pro League players
Eliteserien players
Belgian football managers
Expatriate football managers in Norway
Association football defenders